the Kuwait women's national under-17 football team, represent Kuwait in international women's youth football. The team is governed by the Women's Committee of Kuwait Football Association (KFA). The team also serves as the women's national under-18 and women's national under-16 football team of Kuwait.

History
In 2019, the women's committee of the Kuwait football association launched for the first time the youth women's team, right away after its creation, the team held a training camp in the Austrian capital Vienna from 1 to 15 August 2019, as preparation for their first appearance in WAFF U-18 Girls Championship, during the camp they played three friendlies against youth teams of Austrian clubs.

In December 2019, the Kuwaiti U-17 team started its historic journey with a debut participation in WAFF U-18 Girls Championship hosted in neighboring Bahrain. Kuwait lost all its three matches to finish sixth out of seven.

The team came back to the international stage in 2023, where they hosted their Saudi counterpart who are competing in their first international game to play two friendly games on 4 and 8 March 2023.

Fixtures and results

Legend

2019

2020

2023

Coaching staff

Coaching history

 Ali Al-Dhahi (2019–2020)
 Nilufar Hodjaeva (2023–)

Players

Current squad
The following players were named for the two friendly matches against  on 4 and 8 March 2023.

Competitive record

WAFF U-18 Women's Championship

Arab U-17 Women's Cup

See also
Kuwait women's national football team
Football in Kuwait

References

Arabic women's national under-17 association football teams
under-17
Asian women's national under-17 association football teams